Aleksandar Bošković is Professor of Social Anthropology  at the PPGAS, Federal University of the North Rio Grande in Natal (Brazil), who wrote or edited nineteen books and several hundred articles on history and theory of anthropology, mostly from a transactionalist and comparative perspective. In 2018/2019 he was a Research Fellow at the Institute for Advanced Studies (Institut d'Études Avancées) in Lyon.  Together with his colleague and economics professor John Hamman (Florida State University), Bošković organized a two-day conference about rationality, at the University of Lyon, on 10–11 April 2019.
Aleksandar Bošković is Visiting Professor of Social Anthropology at the State University of Rio Grande de Norte (UFRN) in Natal, Brazil. He is currently editor of the series "Anthropology's Ancestors," published by Berghahn Books, and co-editor of the Anthropological Journal of European Cultures. Since 1 October 2019 he is Senior Research Scientist ("naučni savetnik") at the Institute of Archaeology in Belgrade.

Studies and early work 
Born in Zemun, Yugoslavia, Bošković studied philosophy in Belgrade between 1982 and 1990. During his studies, Bošković was mostly interested in the work of Ernst Cassirer (1874–1945), especially in his concept of myth as a symbolic form, but at this time he also "discovered" Paul Feyerabend (1924–1994), who turned out to be a lasting influence. Aleksandar spent some years in the so-called "pro-democracy" journalism in Yugoslavia (1983–1990), and briefly worked as foreign politics editor and member of the editorial board of the Belgrade weekly magazine Student (1984/1985). In this period (1984-1990), he contributed to almost all of the major (mostly Belgrade-based) Yugoslav magazines. Aleksandar's journalistic texts and interviews dealt with political issues (he interviewed some of the former Praxis School philosophers – including Gajo Petrović, Svetozar Stojanović, and Mihailo Marković), foreign affairs, but also with cultural issues, comics and science fiction. In recent  years, he has again been active in writing occasionally for the liberal-oriented Belgrade newsmagazine Novi magazin.

His early scholarly publications were influenced by the interest in the study of myth and religion, especially through the perspectives offered by Joseph Campbell (1904–1987) and Mircea Eliade (1907–1986). As a conclusion of the several decades of interest in the study of myth, he edited the Dictionary of Deities and Mythic Beings of the World (in Serbo-Croatian; co-edited with Milan Vukomanović and Zoran Jovanović), a single-volume reference work with 14 contributors, covering Non-classical Mythology. Bošković contributed over 150 entries himself, including all on Australia, Mesoamerica, Africa, Celts, and some on Middle East and Mesopotamia (Baal, Gilgamesh, Ziusudra), and India (Ganesha, Parvati, Rudra, Shiva). More recently, he revisited some of the earlier work on myths, in the edited book in Serbo-Croatian, with some of the classic articles of Joseph Campbell, Beatriz de la Fuente, David Grove, Mircea Eliade, David L. Miller, Milan Vukomanovic, and Alan Watts.
 

Some of his early texts focused on ancient Mesoamerican religions (especially Maya and Mexican/ Aztec). In 1990, Bošković went to Tulane University in New Orleans to study anthropology with Munro S. Edmonson [1924–2002]. Fieldwork in Guatemala in 1991 was inspired by the interest in Classic Maya ceramics, but this interest gradually waned, mostly due to Bošković's dissatisfaction with the then-dominant "direct historical approach" in Mesoamerican studies and the tendency by some anthropologists to use material from looted sites. However, he continued to occasionally review books on this topic, especially for the journal Anthropos.  He kept in touch with several prominent Maya archaeologists, like Richard E. W. Adams (1931–2015), American archaeologist who taught at the University of Texas at San Antonio, who influenced Bošković with his general perspective and methodological rigor; and also with the leading French Mayanist at the time, Claude-François Baudez (1932–2013), from the CNRS (Centre national de la recherche scientifique). The interest in Mesoamerica was revisited in a book published by Archaeopress in 2017, Mesoamerican Religions and Archaeology. The book includes a number of review essays, including chapters on The Meaning of Maya Myths, Aztec Great Goddesses, and ways of interpreting the Codex Borbonicus (or Codex Cihuacoatl).

Bošković defended the M.A. thesis (supervised by Munro S. Edmonson), "William Robertson Smith and the Anthropological Study of Myth," at Tulane University in April 1993. William Robertson Smith remained part of his interest, present in his courses on myth and religion, culminating in the recent anthropological biography, published by the Berghahn Books.

From New Orleans Bošković went to do Ph.D. at the University of St Andrews in Scotland. This move was motivated by the interest in contemporary anthropology, combined with the interpretive approach, to which he came through the influence of Clifford Geertz (1926–2006). In St. Andrews, he was first supervised by Ladislav Holy (1933–1997). Holy proved to be a major influence on Bošković's research with his version of methodological individualism. Following Holy's illness, Bošković was supervised by Nigel J. Rapport, and defended his Ph.D. thesis (Constructing Gender in Contemporary Anthropology) on 1 November 1996. The ethnographic part of the thesis focused on the feminist groups in Slovenia. Methodologically, some of the conclusions were influenced by Ladislav Holy's critical interpretative approach, as well as by Marilyn Strathern's and Henrietta L. Moore's anthropology of gender – especially considering gender as a social and cultural construct).

While in St Andrews, Bošković also met a brilliant linguist in the Department of Social Anthropology, Sándor G. J. Hervey (1942–1997) and read critical editions of Ferdinand de Saussure's (1857–1913) Cours de linguistique générale. Saussure's concept of the linguistic sign also proved to be a major influence in his work.

Academic career 
Bošković taught his first academic course at the University of St Andrews in the Martinmas Term of 1994 ("Mesoamerican Pre-Columbian Civilisations", at the Honours' level). He started teaching part-time at the Faculty of Social Sciences of the University of Ljubljana in 2000 (courses "Contemporary Anthropology" and "Anthropology and Feminism", at the M.A. level). However, his most important teaching experience was when he moved to the Department of Anthropology of the University of Brasília, where he was influenced by Mariza Peirano's and Roberto Cardoso de Oliveira's (1928–2006) concept of a horizontally-structured anthropology. (This will later influence his interest in "World Anthropologies.") In Brasília, Bošković taught courses on gender, myth, anthropological theory, Latin America, but also started to develop some interest in the concept of Europe, as he was actually hired as "Visiting Professor of European Ethnology." His monograph on Mesoamerica (Mesoamerican Religions and Archaeology: Essays in Pre-Columbian Civilizations) was published by Archaeopress in January 2017.

Following the invitation of Robert J. Thornton, in February 2001 Bošković moved to the University of the Witwatersrand (Johannesburg, South Africa) on the Post-Doctoral Research Fellowship. There he also taught courses on religion, myth, and ethnicity. While in Johannesburg, he was fortunate enough to meet (and have opportunity to discuss anthropology with) W.D. Hammond-Tooke (1926–2004), the last of the great 20th century South African anthropologists. In 2003, Bošković was hired as Senior lecturer at the Department of Anthropology of Rhodes University, a department that Hammond-Tooke helped establish during the 1960s. At Rhodes, Bošković further developed his interests in the history and theory of anthropology. This Department provided a brilliant academic setting, with colleagues like Chris de Wet, Robin Palmer, Penny Bernard, among others. Furthermore, his interest in history and theory of anthropology resulted in publication of several books. His book Myth, Politics, Ideology was published in late 2006 in Belgrade, and it covered different theoretical aspects of the study of myths, understood (in Raymond Aron's sense) as part of ideology. The book also included several chapters on different aspects of Mesoamerican religions – some in revised versions from their original publications, and some previously unpublished. This also coincided with Bošković's interest in the study of ethnicity and nationalism, and his overall view that multiculturalism is an essential component of all human societies. Some of these aspects were discussed while he was a guest at the University of Oslo in 2007, following the invitation of a friend and colleague, Thomas Hylland Eriksen.

Aleksandar Bošković was invited to teach in the Department of Ethnology and Anthropology of the Belgrade's Faculty of Philosophy in 2009. He began teaching courses related to history and theory in anthropology, mostly due to the favorable reception of his introductory book in anthropology, published in 2010. In 2012, the Senate of the University of Belgrade elected him as a full Professor, and he taught full-time in the department from 1 January 2013 until 3 February 2022. He is also Professor of Anthropology at the University of Donja Gorica in Montenegro. Between 2003 and 2019 Bošković worked at the Institute of Social Sciences in Belgrade, where he was (May 2009- February 2017) Head of the Center for Political Studies and Public Opinion Research. From 1 October 2019 Bošković is Senior Research Scientist ("naučni savetnik") at the Archaeological Institute in Belgrade, with the Viminacium project.

Aleksandar Bošković taught at the Universities of St Andrews (1994), Belgrade (then Yugoslavia, 1998), Brasília (Brazil, 1999–2001), University of the Witwatersrand (Johannesburg, South Africa, 2001–2003), and Rhodes University (Grahamstown, South Africa, 2003–2006). Between 2000 and 2014, Aleksandar Bošković was teaching in the Post-graduate Program in Anthropology of the Faculty of Social Sciences (FDV), University of Ljubljana (Slovenia).

Between August 2016 and October 2020, Bošković was the EASA Book Series Editor. Together with Han Vermeulen, he was co-convenor of the History of Anthropology Network of the EASA (2016-2018).

Involvement with human rights
From 1996, Bošković was a member of The Belgrade Circle, an "Association of Independent Intellectuals" that was opposed to nationalist policies of Serbian government, and whose members included philosopher Miladin Životić (1930-1997) and writer Radomir Konstantinović (1928-2011). Between 1996 and 2000 he was Associate Editor of the Association's journal, The Belgrade Circle Journal, for which he also translated several articles, wrote a couple of reviews, and edited a special section on different approaches and interpretations of the 1982 movie Blade Runner.

In 2006, Aleksandar Bošković briefly worked as Program Director (in charge of transitional justice) in the Humanitarian Law Center in Belgrade. The interest in human rights followed on his criticism of nationalism and violence and led to his continuing collaboration with other human rights organizations in Serbia in the 1990s (like the Helsinki Committee for Human Rights). Bošković also worked for the UNDP in Belgrade on several short-term contracts, again on topics related to transitional justice. Throughout this period he has been an outspoken critic of nationalism, as well as of all other totalitarian and discriminatory practices and tendencies within Serbian society. In mid-1990s Bošković used the then-emerging concept of virtual reality to refer to the ways in which the political elites of Serbia (as well as other post-Yugoslav societies) understood the reality and the world among them. Several of his article on this topic were published in the Canadian Journal for Political Theory and widely read. The suggestion made in his writings was that the foreign observers and diplomats trying to communicate with Serbian leaders would be much more successful if they were aware of the concept of virtual reality, as the reality that the local political leaders believed in had no connection with what is ordinary considered as real.

Following his interest in psychoanalysis, Bošković used Christopher Bollas' concept of the "fascist state of mind" to elaborate on the political and social situation in Serbia, in an essay published in the Belgrade weekly Novi magazin, on 15 June 2017. More recently, he also commented on the pervasiveness of racism in Serbian society, and the fact that it is a topic that is never discussed in Serbia.

When considering wider implications of the persuasiveness of nationalist-inspired thinking and ideas, he organized a round table debate dedicated to Benedict Anderson (1936–2015), at the Institute of Social Sciences in Belgrade. This was at least in part due to the influence that Bruce Kapferer's ideas had on him. Bošković also published a paper on anthropological studies of myths and nationalism in 2013, in the oldest anthropology journal in the world, Zeitschrift für Ethnologie - as a review article of Kapferer's major book. He wrote a chapter that deals with Serbia's troubled relationship with her own past, and the inability of the country's elites to come to terms with its nationalistic past. This paper was based on a presentation from the conference held at Landskronna (Sweden), in early June 2012. The chapter's title is "Serbia and the Surplus of History: Being Small, Large, and Small Again".

In connection with the political attitude that presupposes rejection of all forms of discrimination and intolerance, and following up on his research on gender for his PhD thesis, Bošković also contributed an entry "Images of Gender and Sexuality in Southern Africa" for The Wiley Blackwell Encyclopedia of Gender and Sexuality Studies, as well as (with his colleague from the Institute of Social Sciences, Suzana Ignjatović) on "Gender equality in Serbia".

Teaching and research

Bošković edited a volume Other People's Anthropologies: Ethnographic Practice on the Margins (New York and Oxford: Berghahn Books, 2008; paperback edition in 2010) The book presented an important contribution to the growing field of "World Anthropologies," as it dealt with different national/regional anthropological traditions (including Russian, Dutch, Bulgarian, Kenyan, Argentinian, Turkish, Cameroonian, Japanese, Yugoslav, Norwegian, and Brazilian), all of them located outside of the so-called "central (or dominant) anthropological traditions" (Anglo-American, French and German). However, better known in Serbo-Croatian (and in the former Yugoslav region) is his book Kratak uvod u antropologiju [A Brief Introduction to Anthropology], published in late 2010 by the Jesenski i Turk in Zagreb (Croatia). Serbian edition of the book was published in April 2010, based on a series of lectures delivered at the Rex Cultural Centre. In 2014, he published a book in Serbia on Anthropological perspectives

As a result of his collaboration with the Max Planck Institute for Social Anthropology, Aleksandar Bošković also co-edited a volume on the development of anthropologies/ ethnologies in Southeastern Europe between 1945 and 1991, with Chris Hann, in which he also contributed a Postscript. Together with Günther Schlee, he also organized a conference which commemorated 75 years since the publication of the seminal book African Political Systems. The volume was published by Berghahn Books in 2022.

As part of a dialogue about the anthropological perspectives on identity and identification, Bošković also published a review essay on the uses of rational choice in anthropology in Ethnos in 2012 (with Suzana Ignjatović). The interest in rationality also resulted in the process of helping Suzana Ignjatović organize a Symposium about Individualism at the Institute of Social Sciences in Belgrade, on 20 October 2017. The Symposium resulted in the edited volume, with international contributors including Walter Block, Veselin Vukotić, and Patrick Laviolette. This event also received attention (and formed a major part in the leading story) in one of the leading Serbian news magazines.

In early 2020, he began research on the way in which individuals objectify social facts, based on the research of Scottish psychoanalyst Ronald Fairbairn (1889-1964). The research was interrupted by the outbreak of the COVID-19 pandemic, but that provided an opportunity for another line of research into the rationality of human behavior and the choices that people make. This is an ongoing research.

Guest lectures and invited seminars
Since 1986, Aleksandar gave more than 220 guest lectures or seminars and six short courses in 27 countries. He delivered these lectures and seminars at, among other places, University of Oslo, University of Bergen, Goldsmiths College, Vanderbilt University, College of William and Mary, University of Cambridge, University of St. Andrews, Ben Gurion University of the Negev, Hebrew University of Jerusalem's School of Philosophy and Religions, and University of Hamburg. In recent years, he also spoke about topics such as rationality (both at the IUAES Congress in Manchester in 2013, and at the Inter-Congress in Chiba, Japan in 2014), identity (at the meeting of the Croatian Ethnological Society in Zagreb in 2013), Giambattista Vico (at the ASA Decennial Conference in Edinburgh, 2014), ethnicity  (in the Masters' seminar at the University of Leipzig, 2014) and anthropology in Belgrade (at the Institute of Social Anthropology, Wilhelms University of Münster (Germany), in 2014). In late April 2017, Bošković lectured at the Department of Social Anthropology at the Panteion University in Athens, as part of the ERASMUS exchange.

He co-organized (with Salma Siddique) a panel on "Anthropology and psychotherapy" at the ASA conference in Exeter in April 2015, and presented a seminar on Edvard Munch at the Comparative Sociology Department of the University of Leiden. With Professor Günther Schlee, he organized a Workshop commemorating 75th anniversary of the African Political Systems at the Max Planck Institute for Social Anthropology, 10–11 September 2015. With David Shankland, he co-convened the workshop Themes in the history of anthropology at the 2016 EASA, and with Thomas Hylland Eriksen, the workshop Clashing scales of infrastructural development at the 2017 SIEF Congress in Göttingen.

In early 2018, following the invitation of his colleague, anthropologist and psychotherapist Salma Siddique, he spent six weeks as a Visiting Researcher at the University of Aberdeen. During this period, Bošković gave two talks about The Meaning of Maya Myths (unrelated to the 1989 article), at King's College, Aberdeen and at the University of Edinburgh, as well as a lecture on Anthropology and Psychoanalysis, in the School of Education. In the early June, he gave a talk on Classic Maya myths and politics at the 12th Annual International Conference on Comparative Mythology at Tohoku University in Sendai, Japan. He continued his association with the IACM, becoming a member of the Board of Directors in 2020. In June 2022, 15th conference of the International Association for Comparative Mythology (IACM) was held in Belgrade and Viminacium, at the Institute of Archaeology. The theme of the conference was Sacred Ground: Place and Space in Mythology and Religion.

In March and April 2022, Bošković taught a course as Visiting Professor in the Institute of Ethnology and Cultural Anthropology at Jagiellonian University in Cracow, Poland. His co-edited book on African Political Systems was published in April 2022, and the book that sums up the history of humanity from an anthropological perspective ("from the Stone Age to Computer Age"), was published in Serbo-Croatian in 2021.

This last title was the third in what Bošković referred (tongue-in-cheek) to as his "COVID trilogy" - i.e., the books completed and submitted to publishers during the COVID crisis, in 2020 and 2021, the other two being the William Robertson Smith biography, and the edited volume on myth. Most recently, on 15 December 2022, he gave a presentation on Smith's influence on Émile Durkheim as part of the Séminaire sur la « révélation » de Durkheim année 3 (2022/2023), organized by Matthieu Béra, Césor/EHESS (University of Bordeaux).

Selected works in English

 Anthropologists at war? Anthropology Today 38 (2022)
 African Political Systems Revisited: Changing Perspectives on Statehood and Power (2022, ed. w/Günther Schlee)
 William Robertson Smith (2021)
 Anthropology and Nationalism. American Anthropologist 121 (2019)
 Mesoamerican Religions and Archaeology: Essays in Pre-Columbian Civilizations (2017)
The Anthropological Field on the Margins of Europe, 1945–1991 (2013, ed. w/Chris Hann)
Other People's Anthropologies: Ethnographic Practice on the Margins (2008/2010, ed.)
 Serbia and the surplus of history: Being small, large, and small again, in Small Countries: Structures and Sensibilities (2017, eds. Ulf Hannerz and Andre Gingrich)
 Globalization and its discontents, in Globalizacija i izolacionizam (2017, ed. Veselin Vukotić et al.)
 Gender equality in Serbia (w/Suzana Ignjatović), in Gender Equality in a Global Perspective (2017, eds. Anders Örtenblad, Raili Marling and Snježana Vasiljević)
 Serbia and the Surplus of History: Being Small, Large, and Small Again, in Small Countries: Structures and Sensibilities (2017, eds. Uff Hannerz and Andre Gingrich)
 Escape from the future: Anthropological practice and everyday life, in Balkan Heritages (2015, eds. Maria Couroucli and Tchavdar Marinov)
 A very personal anthropology of Mary Douglas Anthropological Notebooks 22 (2016)
 Socio-cultural anthropology today: An overview Campos 6 (2005)
 Anthropological perspectives on myth Anuário Antropológico 99 (2002)
 Great Goddesses of the Aztecs: Their meaning and functions Indiana 12 (1995)

References

External links

Institute of Archaeology (in Serbo-Croatian)
Personal website
Author's page on Amazon.com
Seminar on William Robertson Smith at the Institute of Sociology, Jagiellonian University, Cracow, 31 March 2022 
Lecture about William Robertson Smith at Karavansaraj, Belgrade, 8 November 2021
Lecture on ancient Egypt at Karavansaraj, Belgrade, 10 September 2020
Lecture on Munch
Home page at the Faculty for Applied Science, UDG (in Serbo-Croatian)

1962 births
Anthropologists
Cultural anthropologists
Living people
Social anthropologists
Alumni of the University of St Andrews
Scientists from Belgrade